Isaac Koedijck (1618, Amsterdam – 1668, Amsterdam), was a Dutch Golden Age painter.

Biography
According to Johan van Gool, he saw two excellent cabinet pieces painted in the tradition of Gerard Dou in the collection of Willem Lormier in the Hague, of a farmer being bandaged on his knee in a "barber shop", and a boy stealing some almonds while looking over his shoulder to see if anyone notices.

According to the RKD he worked in Amsterdam (and Haarlem), Indonesia, and India. He is known for genre works and portraits.

References

Isaac Koedijck on Artnet

1618 births
1668 deaths
Dutch Golden Age painters
Dutch male painters
Painters from Amsterdam